The following Confederate States Army units and commanders fought in the Battle of Nashville of the American Civil War. The order of battle has been compiled from the army organization during the campaign and reports. The Union order of battle is shown separately.

Abbreviations used

Military rank
 Gen = General
 LTG = Lieutenant General
 MG = Major General
 BG = Brigadier General
 Col = Colonel
 Ltc = Lieutenant Colonel
 Maj = Major
 Cpt = Captain
 Lt = Lieutenant
 Sgt = Sergeant

Other
 w = wounded
 mw = mortally wounded
 k = killed
 c = captured

Army of Tennessee

Gen John B. Hood, Commanding

Cheatham’s Corps
MG Benjamin F. Cheatham

Chief of Artillery
Col Melancthon Smith

Lee’s Corps
LTG Stephen D. Lee

Chief of Artillery
Maj John W. Johnston

Stewart’s Corps
LTG Alexander P. Stewart

Chief of Artillery
Ltc Samuel C. Williams

Cavalry Corps
MG Nathan B. Forrest(Detached; at Murfreesboro with Jackson's and Buford's Divisions.)

Notes

References
U.S. War Department, The War of the Rebellion: a Compilation of the Official Records of the Union and Confederate Armies, U.S. Government Printing Office, 1880–1901.
 McDonough, James Lee. Nashville: The Western Confederacy’s Final Gamble. Knoxville: The University of Tennessee Press, 2004.
 Nashville page, Civil War Home site

American Civil War orders of battle
Confederate Order Of Battle
Nathan Bedford Forrest
John Bell Hood